Auratonota flora is a species of moth of the family Tortricidae. It is found in Ecuador (Tungurahua Province and Sucumbíos Province).

The wingspan is about 19 mm. There are orange-brown markings on the forewings, with the distal half finely edged with black. The costal strigulae and ground colour are reduced to white or silvery dots. The hindwings are dark dull brown.

References

Moths described in 2000
Auratonota
Moths of South America